Walter Oswald Lanfranconi (November 9, 1916 – August 17, 1986) was a Major League Baseball pitcher. The 155 lb. right-hander played for the Chicago Cubs (1941) and Boston Braves (1947). His career was unusual in that he went almost six years between major league appearances.

Lanfranconi made his major league debut in relief against the Philadelphia Phillies at Wrigley Field (September 12, 1941). Twelve days later he started and lost 2–0 to All-Star Bucky Walters and the Cincinnati Reds. Then, as a 30-year-old in 1947, he went 4–4 with one save as a starter and reliever for the Braves. In one of his best games, he defeated the Philadelphia Phillies 7–1 in the nightcap of a 4th of July double-header at Shibe Park with 28,580 fans in attendance.

Lanfranconi's career totals include a record of 4–5 in 38 games, 70 innings pitched, 19 strikeouts, and an ERA of 2.96.

Lanfranconi missed the 1943–45 baseball seasons due to military service with the US Army during World War II.

Lanfranconi died in his hometown of Barre, Vermont at the age of 69. He was buried at Hope Cemetery in Barre.

References

External links

Major League Baseball pitchers
Baseball players from Vermont
Chicago Cubs players
Boston Braves players
1916 births
1986 deaths
People from Barre, Vermont
United States Army personnel of World War II
Albany Senators players
American expatriate baseball players in Canada
Beaumont Exporters players
Birmingham Barons players
Dallas Eagles players
Los Angeles Angels (minor league) players
Milwaukee Brewers (AA) players
Toronto Maple Leafs (International League) players